Agneziidae is a family of tunicates belonging to the order Phlebobranchia.

Genera:
 Adagnesia  Kott, 1963
 Agnezia Monniot & Monniot, 1991
 Caenagnesia Ärnbäck-Christie-Linde, 1938
 Proagnesia Millar, 1955
 Pterygascidia Sluiter, 1904

References

Enterogona